The 1980 United States Senate election in Oklahoma was held November 3, 1980. Incumbent Republican U.S. Senator Henry Bellmon decided to retire, instead of seeking a third term. Republican nominee Don Nickles won the open seat.

Major candidates

Democratic 
 Andy Coats, Oklahoma City Mayor

Republican 
 Don Nickles, State Senator

Campaign 
After two years in the State Senate and displeased by the policies of the Carter Administration, Nickles ran for the United States Senate in 1980 to succeed Republican Henry Bellmon who was retiring. As an unknown in a field crowded with business and political bigwigs, Nickles was not initially given much of a chance. Bellmon even tried to convince him to wait and run for the U.S. House. Utilizing personal contact and passing out unique "wooden nickel" campaign button novelties, Nickles unique grassroot community ties to local Amway distributors throughout Oklahoma gave him an interpersonal network which proved helpful. Nickles beat two well funded oil millionaires (Jack Zink and Ed Noble) in the primary and won the primary run-off against Zink, a race car driver. He later won the general election against Democrat Oklahoma City Mayor Andy Coats and independent Charles Nesbitt, the Oklahoma Corporation Commissioner and former Oklahoma Attorney General. At the age of 32, Nickles was the youngest Republican ever elected to the United States Senate.

Results

See also 
 1980 United States Senate elections

References 

1980 Oklahoma elections
Oklahoma
1980